Sister Sin is a Swedish heavy metal band from Gothenburg. The band released four full-length albums, with the most recent Black Lotus released October 27, 2014. Sister Sin toured in Europe and North America with bands such as Slayer, King Diamond, Lordi and In This Moment before splitting in November 2015. The band reunited in December 2019.

History
The group was formed in 2002 and released various recordings via smaller indie labels. They issued their first non-indie album Switchblade Serenades via Victory Records in October 2008; it reached number 107 on Top Heatseekers in the first week of release in the US. The band performed two US national tours in support of the album, with bands like Motörhead, Otep, and Ill Niño. Sister Sin also toured Europe with Arch Enemy and played at festivals like Sweden Rock and Norway Rock. In early 2010 they recorded a follow-up album entitled True Sound Of The Underground with producer Henrik Edenhed (of Dead by April, Lambretta etc.). which landed on number 96 at Top Heatseekers in the United States on June 22, 2010

Later that year the band parted ways with bassist Benton Wiberg, due to his inability to tour. The band recruited Strandh as a new bassist and toured Europe with Lordi. Three US tours followed, first with Michael Schenker Group, Lynch Mob ( Liv Jagrell's boyfriend, known simply as Ricky (Babylon Bombs), filled in on an interim basis. The second tour was with Straight Line Stitch, System Divide and In This Moment, then with Blackguard, Destrophy and Otep.

Sister Sin again toured Europe in fall 2011 as special guest for U.D.O. supporting their single "Rock 'N Roll", featuring German metal singer Doro Pesch.

The band's fourth album Now And Forever was released October 23, 2012 via Victory Records worldwide. The album was mixed by Cameron Webb (Motörhead, Social Distortion, Danzig) and entered the Swedish Rock/Metal Charts at #6 and #36 on Top Heatseekers in the first week of release in the US . The album is their best selling release to date and saw them trekking through North America, Russia and in Europe.

In 2014, Sister Sin began recording their fifth album, Black Lotus. On September 16 the band premiered a lyric video for the album's first radio single, "Chaos Royale", on Metal Hammer. The album was released on Victory Records October 27, 2014 along with the official music video for "Chaos Royale" which premiered on Loudwire and full album stream on Blabbermouth

Sister Sin played the entirety of the 2015 Rockstar Energy Drink Mayhem Festival, performing on the Victory Records stage.

On November 7, 2015, the band issued a statement that band had come to an end due to members' burnout after seven years of regular touring. Nonetheless, the statement also suggested that the band members may pick up the band again in the future.

On December 23, 2019, it was announced the band had reunited and would begin touring in 2020.

Current members
 Liv Jagrell — vocals
 Jimmy Hiltula — guitar
 Andreas Strandh — bass
 Dave Sundberg — drums

Previous members
Benton Wiberg — bass
Chris (Chriz Bednarz) — bass
Johnny — guitar

Discography

Studio albums
 Dance of the Wicked (2003)
 Switchblade Serenades (2008)
 True Sound of the Underground (2010)
 Now and Forever (2012)
 Black Lotus (2014)

EPs
 Smash The Silence EP (2007)

Music videos
 Sister Sin - One Out of Ten (2008)
 Sister Sin - On Parole (2008)
 Sister Sin - Sound of the Underground (2010)
 Sister Sin - Outrage (2010)
 Sister Sin - 24-7 (2010)
 Sister Sin - Rock 'N' Roll (Motörhead Cover) ft. Doro (2011)
 Sister Sin - End Of The Line (2012)
 Sister Sin - Fight Song (2013)
 Sister Sin - Hearts of Cold (2013)
 Sister Sin - Chaos Royale (2014)
 Sister Sin - Desert Queen (2015)

References

External links

 Sister Sin official site
  Sister Sin at Victory Records

Musical groups from Gothenburg
Swedish heavy metal musical groups
Victory Records artists
Musical groups established in 2002
2002 establishments in Sweden
Musical groups disestablished in 2015
2015 disestablishments in Sweden